Stigmella lithocarpella is a moth of the family Nepticulidae. It is only known from Yunnan.

The wingspan is about 6.1 mm. Larvae have been found in October, adults were reared in November.

The larvae feed on Lithocarpus dealbatus. They mine the leaves of their host plant. The mine consists of a contorted gallery, filled with black frass, later becoming an elongated blotch with black frass deposited in lateral lines.

External links
Nepticulidae (Lepidoptera) in China, 1. Introduction and Stigmella (Schrank) feeding on Fagaceae

Nepticulidae
Moths of Asia
Moths described in 2000